Coastal Batholith may refer to:
Coastal Batholith of Peru formed in the Mesozoic
Coastal Batholith of central Chile formed in the Paleozoic